Catherine Fonteney (23 June 1879– 29 April 1966) was a French film actress.

Catherine Fonteney was born Marie Alexandrine Catherine Fontaine in Paris and died in Dijon.

Selected filmography
 Romain Kalbris (1923)
 The Secret of Polichinelle (1923)
 Little Devil May Care (1928)
 The Red Head (1932)
 Poliche (1934)
 The Midnight Prince (1934)
 Song of Farewell (1934)
 Divine (1935)
 The Tender Enemy (1936)
 The Man from Nowhere (1937)
 Nightclub Hostess (1939)
 The Lost Woman (1942)
 Wicked Duchess (1942)
 The Guardian Angel (1942)
 Mahlia the Mestiza (1943)
 Shop Girls of Paris (1943)
 The Lame Devil (1948)
 Dear Caroline (1951)
 Beautiful Love (1951)
 Under the Sky of Paris (1951)
 Darling Caroline (1951)
 The Lovers of Marianne (1953)
 The Long Absence (1961)

References

Bibliography
 Goble, Alan. The Complete Index to Literary Sources in Film. Walter de Gruyter, 1999.

External links

1879 births
1966 deaths
French film actresses
French silent film actresses
20th-century French actresses
Actresses from Paris